Hortensia Arzapalo (born 29 July 1981) is a Peruvian long-distance runner. She competed in the marathon event at the 2015 World Championships in Athletics in Beijing, China.

See also
 Peru
 Peru at the 2015 World Championships in Athletics

References

Peruvian female marathon runners
Peruvian female long-distance runners
Living people
Place of birth missing (living people)
1981 births
World Athletics Championships athletes for Peru
20th-century Peruvian women
21st-century Peruvian women